Thomas Joseph Lovett (December 7, 1863 – March 19, 1928) was an American professional baseball pitcher. He played all or part of six seasons in Major League Baseball between 1885 and 1894.

After playing for the Waterbury team in the Connecticut State League in 1884, Lovett made his major league debut on June 4, 1885 for the Philadelphia Athletics. After pitching only 16 games, he did not pitch in the majors again until being signed by the Brooklyn Bridegrooms in 1889, when he helped the team to the American Association pennant. Brooklyn jumped to the National League in 1890, and that year, Lovett was arguably the best player on the club. He went 30-11 with a 2.78 ERA. In the World Series, he pitched four complete games and won two of them, as Brooklyn played the Louisville Colonels to a draw.

On June 22, 1891, Lovett pitched a no-hitter against the New York Giants, a 4-0 victory.

As quickly as Lovett rose to prominence, he fell. He sat out the 1892 season, and when he returned, he was largely ineffective. He played in the minor leagues until 1896, after which he retired.

Lovett died at the age of 64 in his hometown of Providence, Rhode Island and is interred at St. Ann Cemetery in Cranston, Rhode Island.

See also
 List of Major League Baseball no-hitters

External links

Baseball Almanac

Major League Baseball pitchers
Philadelphia Athletics (AA) players
Brooklyn Bridegrooms players
Brooklyn Grooms players
Boston Beaneaters players
Waterbury (minor league baseball) players
Newburyport Clamdiggers players
Oshkosh (minor league baseball) players
Bridgeport Giants players
Omaha Omahogs players
Omaha Lambs players
Providence Clamdiggers (baseball) players
Providence Grays (minor league) players
Scranton Miners players
Rochester Blackbirds players
Baseball players from Providence, Rhode Island
19th-century baseball players
1863 births
1928 deaths